The Johnstown Jets were a professional ice hockey team from Johnstown, Pennsylvania. The Jets were founded in the Eastern Amateur Hockey League for the 1950–51 season, playing at the newly constructed Cambria County War Memorial Arena. The Jets won consecutive EHL championships in 1951–52 and 1952–53.

When the EAHL suspended operations in 1953, the Jets transferred to the International Hockey League, where they played two seasons. Johnstown were Turner Cup finalists in 1953–54, losing four games to two, to the Cincinnati Mohawks.

In 1955, the Jets joined the Eastern Hockey League (a league founded from the EAHL), and won three consecutive EHL championships in 1959–60, 1960–61 and 1961–62. Johnstown remained in the league until its demise in 1973.

The Jets then joined the new North American Hockey League in 1973. Dick Roberge coached  Johnstown to the Lockhart Cup championship 1974–75, defeating the Broome Dusters. That season's playoff run included the Carlson brothers, Jeff, Jack and Steve, who became the basis for the Hanson Brothers in the movie Slap Shot. Jeff and Steve Carlson portrayed their fictional selves in the movie, while former Jet Dave Hanson portrayed Jack. The Jets played four seasons total in the NAHL before the league folded in 1977. The team itself folded in the offseason, when the Johnstown flood of 1977 damaged the arena's ice making equipment.

Johnstown was later represented by the Johnstown Wings (later Red Wings) from 1978-80. The Red Wings folded after two seasons, but hockey returned to Johnstown in 1988 with the Johnstown Chiefs, which named itself after the Jets' fictional counterpart from Slap Shot.

Season-by-season results

NHL alumni

List of Johnstown Jets who played in the National Hockey League, 46 in total.

League All-Stars
The following players were named to the league's respective All-Star team, announced at the end of the season.

Most All-Star appearances

References

 EHL standings and statistics
 IHL standings and statistics
 NAHL standings and statistics

External links
 Johnstown Jets - www.officialgamepuck.com
 Old-time hockey indeed - Jets history
 How the Johnstown Jets were turned into the Charlestown Chiefs

Calgary Cowboys minor league affiliates
Defunct ice hockey teams in the United States
Defunct sports teams in Pennsylvania
Eastern Hockey League teams
Houston Aeros minor league affiliates
Ice hockey clubs established in 1950
Ice hockey clubs disestablished in 1977
Ice hockey teams in Pennsylvania
International Hockey League (1945–2001) teams
Kansas City Scouts minor league affiliates
Minnesota Fighting Saints minor league affiliates
North American Hockey League (1973–1977) teams
Pittsburgh Penguins minor league affiliates
St. Louis Blues minor league affiliates
Washington Capitals minor league affiliates